Coleophora psamata is a moth of the family Coleophoridae. It is found in Turkestan and Uzbekistan.

The wingspan is 18–20 mm.

The larvae feed on Salsola species, including Salsola orientalis. They create a silky case, sparsely covered with sand particles in the form of uneven longitudinal stripes. The valve is three-sided. The length of the case is 11–13 mm and it is yellowish-gray in color. Larvae can be found from the end of September to October.

References

psamata
Moths of Asia
Moths described in 1973